Ondřej Berndt (born 29 September 1988) is a Czech alpine skier. He competed in the 2018 Winter Olympics. He also participated in the World Championships in 2013, 2017, 2019 and 2021, where he achieved his best performance in the world with a 17th place in the slalom.

References

1988 births
Living people
Alpine skiers at the 2018 Winter Olympics
Czech male alpine skiers
Olympic alpine skiers of the Czech Republic
Sportspeople from Jablonec nad Nisou
Universiade bronze medalists for the Czech Republic
Universiade medalists in alpine skiing
Competitors at the 2013 Winter Universiade